Karat-Tamak (Qarattamaq) is a rural locality (a village) in Starotuymazinsky Selsoviet, Tuymazinsky District, Bashkortostan, Russia. The population was 78 as of 2010. There are 2 streets.

Geography 
Karat-Tamak is located 13 km southwest of Tuymazy (the district's administrative centre) by road. Starye Tuymazy is the nearest rural locality.

References 

Rural localities in Tuymazinsky District